Alan Fernand Badel (11 September 1923 – 19 March 1982) was an English stage actor who also appeared frequently in the cinema, radio and television and was noted for his richly textured voice which was once described as "the sound of tears".

Early life
Badel was born in Rusholme, Manchester, and educated at Burnage High School. He fought in France and Germany during the Second World War, serving as a paratrooper on D-Day. He partially lost his hearing when a shell exploded near him.

Career
In his early career, he played leading parts, including Romeo and Hamlet, with the Old Vic and Stratford companies.

Badel's earliest film role was as John the Baptist in the Rita Hayworth version of Salome (1953), a version in which the story was altered to make Salome a Christian convert who dances for Herod in order to save John rather than have him condemned to death. He portrayed Richard Wagner in Magic Fire (1955), a biopic about the composer. He also played the role of Karl Denny, the impresario, in the film Bitter Harvest (1963). Around the same time, he played opposite Vivien Merchant in a television version of Harold Pinter's play The Lover (also 1963) and as Edmond Dantès in a BBC television adaptation of Alexandre Dumas' The Count of Monte Cristo (1964).

Badel also played the villainous sunglasses-wearing Najim Beshraavi in Arabesque (1966) with Gregory Peck and Sophia Loren. He played the French Interior Minister in The Day of the Jackal (1973), a political thriller about the attempted assassination of President Charles de Gaulle. In the political television drama Bill Brand (1976) he played David Last, the government's Employment Minister, a left-wing former backbench MP who had recently joined the front bench after 30 years in the House of Commons. One of his last roles was that of Baron Nicolas de Gunzburg in the Paramount film Nijinsky (1980). A television adaptation for the BBC of The Woman in White (1982) by Wilkie Collins, in which Badel played the role of Count Fosco, was shown posthumously.

Personal life
Badel married the actress Yvonne Owen in 1942 and they remained married until his death from a heart attack in Chichester, aged 58. Their daughter Sarah Badel is an actress.

Filmography

Film

Television

References

External links

 
 

1923 births
1982 deaths
Military personnel from Manchester
English male film actors
English male stage actors
People from Rusholme
British Army personnel of World War II
20th-century English male actors
Male actors from Manchester
Best Actor BAFTA Award (television) winners
British Parachute Regiment soldiers